Henry Black  (December 18, 1798 – August 16, 1873) was a Quebec lawyer, judge and political figure.

He was born in Quebec City in 1798, studied there and was admitted to the bar in 1820. He joined the law practice of Andrew Stuart at Quebec City. In 1836, he was appointed judge in the Court of Vice-Admiralty for the Quebec district, serving as its president for 37 years. In 1840, he was named to the Special Council that governed Lower Canada after the Lower Canada Rebellion. In 1841, he was elected to the Legislative Assembly of the Province of Canada for Quebec City and was a supporter of the Tories. He did not run in 1844. He was named a Companion in the Order of the Bath in 1862.

He died in Cacouna after an attack of erysipelas in 1873.

External links
 

1798 births
1873 deaths
Members of the Special Council of Lower Canada
Members of the Legislative Assembly of the Province of Canada from Canada East
Lawyers in Quebec
Judges in Quebec
Canadian Companions of the Order of the Bath
Politicians from Quebec City
Lower Canada judges
Province of Canada judges
Anglophone Quebec people